Ken Nelson (born 6 February 1959) is an English record producer, who was born in Liverpool. After several years working on demos and independent artists, he achieved success with Gomez, and worldwide success with the first Coldplay recording. He has also worked with Badly Drawn Boy, Howling Bells, The Charlatans, Kings of Convenience, The Orange Lights, Ray LaMontagne, Snow Patrol, Paolo Nutini, and Deadbeat Darling.

He has won three US Grammy awards, two Mercury Music Prizes, and was "Music Week" magazine's 'Producer of the Year' in 2003.

The Canadian singer/songwriter Alana Levandoski began recording her second album with producer Ken Nelson in Kelwood, Manitoba, Canada- at a local church in February 2008. Final sessions for her album took place at Parr Street Studios in Liverpool, England in April and May 2008.

Selected discography
1998: Gomez – Bring It On
1999: Gomez – Liquid Skin
2000: Badly Drawn Boy – The Hour of Bewilderbeast
2000: Coldplay – Parachutes
2001: Kings of Convenience – Quiet Is the New Loud
2002: Coldplay – A Rush of Blood to the Head
2005: Coldplay – X&Y
2005: Feeder – Pushing the Senses
2006: Howling Bells – Howling Bells
2006: Paolo Nutini – These Streets
2011: The Gift – Explode
2012: Deadbeat Darling – The Angels Share
2013: Okean Elzy

References

External links
Interview, HitQuarters Nov 2000
Podcast interview with record producer Ken Nelson Nov 2016

1959 births
English record producers
Grammy Award winners
Living people
Musicians from Liverpool